Riverdale Country School is a co-educational, independent, college-preparatory day school in New York City serving pre-kindergarten through twelfth grade. Started as a school for boys, Riverdale Country School became fully coeducational in 1972. It currently serves 1,140 students. According to Niche's 2023 Private School Rankings, Riverdale is ranked the 2nd best private high school in New York City and the 3rd best private K-12 school in the United States.

History

Founded in 1907 by Frank Sutliff Hackett (1878–1952) and his first wife, Francis Dean (Allen) Hackett, Riverdale Country School is one of the oldest country day schools in the United States. Originally known as the Riverdale School for Boys, it began with 12 students and four teachers and promised scholarly, intimate teaching amid abundant recreational space. Describing his school as "an American experiment in education," Hackett later told The New York Times: "We have tried to transform schools from mere nurseries of the brain into a means of nourishing the whole boy — mind, body, and spirit."

An early advocate of outdoor experiences for young people, Hackett started a summer camp known as Camp Riverdale at Long Lake in the Adirondacks (1912–1964) to provide summer recreation for his students. By 1920, Hackett had acquired three acres on Fieldston Road for the school and built a classroom building and dormitory. The 100-room dormitory, designed by McKim, Mead, and White, later became known as Hackett Hall. In 1924, he started the Neighborhood School for boys and girls from grades one to three, and in 1933, the Riverdale Girls School. By World War II, the school attracted both day students and boarders; one student in six or seven came from another country.

Hackett dreamed of expanding the school into an "American World School" and acquired a new site in Riverdale. In 1948, Gen. Dwight Eisenhower, then president of Columbia University, spoke at a dedication ceremony at the site. Hackett died before his dream was realized, and the property was sold. In 1972, the Boys and Girls Schools were combined. In 1985, the Middle and Upper Schools were consolidated on the Hill Campus and the Lower School moved to the River Campus. Hackett was an organizer of the Guild of Independent Schools of New York City, and an organizer and president of the Adirondack Mountain Club.

President John F. Kennedy attended the school from 1927 to 1930 when his family lived in Riverdale. During the 1960 presidential campaign, Kennedy made an appearance in the Bronx. "I said up the street that I was a former resident of the Bronx," he said. "Nobody believes that, but it is true. No other candidate for the presidency can make that statement."

Campuses

Covering , the Hill Campus is located on Fieldston Road, overlooking Van Cortlandt Park. It is home to the Middle School (6th to 8th) and the Upper School (9th to 12th). Facilities include Hackett Hall, Mow Hall, Lindenbaum Center for the Arts, the 9/10 Building, Vinik Hall (the Admissions Building), the Weinstein Science Building, the Science Annex, the Day Care, and the P. Gordon B. Stillman Amphitheater. A new Aquatic Center opened in 2017. The Hill Campus has three playing fields (Frankel Field, Alumni Field, and the Frank J. Bertino Memorial field) and tennis courts. The Marc A. Zambetti '80 Athletic Center includes a gymnasium, fencing room, and workout room. It was recently renovated to add a second gymnasium and an expanded health/fitness center.

The River Campus (Pre-K to 5th) sits on  along the Hudson River. The buildings on the River Campus are the Early Learning Building (Pre-K through second grade classrooms and the gymnasium), the Senior Building (classrooms for drawing, painting, and sculpture), the Admissions/Junior building (includes the Lower School head's office, the Learning Commons, and Admissions, and the Upper Learning Building. Completed in 2016, the Upper Learning Building includes a theater, cafeteria, classrooms for third through fifth grade, and multi-purpose spaces. Architectural Record noted: "It is a building born of exploration, deep discussions with educators about their needs and desires, and a willingness to tweak on the fly." The River Campus also has tennis courts, a playing field, a greenhouse, gardens, and a playground. The land for the River Campus was given to Riverdale by the family of George Walbridge Perkins, an early environmentalist and associate of Theodore Roosevelt and J.P. Morgan. The family also donated their adjacent property, Wave Hill, to the City of New York for a public garden and cultural center.

Academics
In addition to college-preparatory courses in math, science, and humanities, Riverdale offers “maker” programs that combine science, technology, engineering, arts, and mathematics, as well as courses in robotics and coding. Latin, Greek, French, Spanish, Chinese, and Japanese also are offered. Interdisciplinary courses in the Lower, Middle, and Upper Schools encourage students to draw connections across disciplines. Constructing America, a required course for juniors, is co-taught by the History and English faculty. Integrated Liberal Studies, a required course for seniors, explores four essential topics: Virtue, the Self, Social Justice, and the Environment. Independent study opportunities allow students to gain in-depth knowledge in subjects of their choosing. The Global Studies program organizes trips around the world. An outdoor educator organizes hiking, camping and rock-climbing trips in the Hudson Valley, trekking in Patagonia, and kayaking in Alaska.

Riverdale is chartered by the New York State Board of Regents and is accredited by the New York State Association of Independent Schools.

Athletics

As of 2017, Riverdale has a total of 31 varsity interscholastic sports teams, many of which also have junior varsity counterparts except for Cross Country, Crew, Golf, Track and Field, Squash and Swimming. In the Spring of 2013, crew was introduced as a varsity sport for boys and girls, while wrestling was officially cut from the list of sports.

Fall Sports
Cross Country
Fencing Club
Football
Soccer
Field Hockey
Girls' Tennis
Volleyball
Winter Sports
Basketball
Fencing
Squash
Swimming
Spring Sports
Baseball
Softball
Crew
Golf
Lacrosse
Boys' Tennis
Track and Field
Ultimate Frisbee

Awards 
In 2014, Riverdale was awarded the National Athletic Trainers' Association Safe School Award and was declared a National Youth Sports Health & Safety Institute "Best Practices Partner." In 2016, Riverdale was awarded the New York Athletic Training Association's Joseph Abraham Award, which is an award given annually to high schools that provide outstanding athletic injury care to their student athletes. Further titles have been given to individual school teams:
 Boys Soccer:
 Ivy League Champions  — 1952, 1954-1957, 1959, 1961-1963, 1965-1966, 1970-1971, 1975-1976, 1998-1999, 2005-2006, 2015–2016
 NYSAIS Champions  — 1999, 2006, 2014-2015
 Girls Soccer:
 NYSAIS Champions  — 1996, 2003, 2007, 2010-2011
 Ivy League Champions  — 1997, 2003, 2007-2008, 2010-2012, 2014
 Boys Swimming: Ivy League Champions  — 1962-1963, 1976-1977, 2002–2003, 2007
 Girls Swimming: Ivy League Champions  — 2002-2006
 Boys Basketball:
 Ivy League Champions  — 1966-1969, 1972, 1977, 1983, 1986, 2013
 NYSAIS Federation Champions  — 1994, 2013
 Girls Basketball:
 NYSAIS Federation Champions  — 1995-1996, 1998, 2000
 Ivy League Champions  — 1996-1997, 2000
 Baseball:
 Ivy League Champions  — 1968-1970, 2003
 NYSAIS Champions  — 2000
 Volleyball: Ivy League Champions  — 1980-1983, 1995, 2002
 Field Hockey:
 Ivy League Champions  — 1981, 1994, 2007, 2009-2011
 AAIS Champions  — 2007, 2009-2011
 Boys Tennis: Ivy League Champions  — 1987, 2000, 2001, 2010, 2019
 Boys Cross Country: NYSAIS Champions  — 1999
 Girls Lacrosse:
 Ivy League Champions  — 2010-2011
 NYSAIS Champions  — 2011
 Boys Lacrosse: Ivy League Champions  — 2017
 Boys Squash: Ivy League Champions  — 2011
 Ultimate Frisbee: DiscNY B-Division Champions  — 2014

Student life

Arts and activities
Upper School students produce one musical and one play each year in the Jeslo Harris theatre. Riverdale students may participate in the jazz and concert bands, orchestra, chamber music ensembles, chorus, dance team, and the a cappella singing groups, the Rivertones and Testostertones. More than 40 student-led clubs, organizations, and service-learning partnerships are offered.

Student publications
The Riverdale Review is Riverdale's student-run paper. Impressions has published the visual art and creative writing of students in the Upper School for almost 30 years.  Crossroads is Riverdale’s Middle School Literary and Art Magazine. The Falcon Times is the newsletter of the Middle School. Riverdale's faculty and student body also maintain an online non-fiction literary magazine called The Riverdale Reader.

Notable alumni

 Dan Abrams (class of 1984), chief legal affairs anchor for ABC News.
 Virginia Abernethy (born 1934), anthropoloist
 Josh Appelbaum, television writer
 Sosie Bacon (born 1992), actress
 Charlie Barnet (1913-1991), jazz saxophonist, composer and bandleader.
 Jacqueline Barton, chemist
 Rosalyn Baxandall (1939-2015), historian of women's activism and an active New York City feminist.
 Cliff Bayer (born 1977), Olympic foil fencer
 Lisa Birnbach (born 1956, class of 1974), author best known for co-authoring The Official Preppy Handbook
 Richard Blumenthal (born 1946), U.S. Senator from Connecticut.
 Niesha Butler, basketball player, actress, entrepreneur
 DJ Cassidy (born 1981), DJ, record producer and MC.
 Kathleen Cavendish, Marchioness of Hartington (1920-1948), socialite.
 Louis Ozawa Changchien (born 1975), actor
 Chevy Chase (born 1943), actor
 Suzan Johnson Cook (born 1957), presidential advisor, pastor, theologian, author, activist, and Harvard professor who served as the United States Ambassador-at-Large for International Religious Freedom from April 2011 to October 2013.
 Jonathan Dean, United States Ambassador to Mutual and Balanced Force Reductions talks
 Richard Engel (born 1973), NBC News Chief Foreign Correspondent
 Harry Enten, political journalist for CNN and previously FiveThirtyEight
Miranda Hoyt (class of 2015), writing fellow for RespectAbility's 2022 Children’s Content Lab for Disabled TV Creators
 Lawrence Ferlinghetti, (1919-2021), poet, painter and social activist
 Varian Fry (1907-1967), journalist who ran a program helping thousands of Jewish refugees escape from Nazi Germany.
 Peter Galison, the Joseph Pellegrino University Professor in history of science and physics at Harvard University 
 Alexander Garvin, urban planner 
 James Gleick, science writer, author of Chaos: Making a New Science.
 Leopold Godowsky Jr. (1900-1983), co-creator of Kodachrome, the first color transparency film
 Rachel Hadas, and American poet and translator 
 Calvin Hill (born 1947, class of 1965), former NFL player
 Molly Jong-Fast, an author 
 John Kao (born 1950), author and strategic advisor
 Claude Kelly (born 1980), singer, songwriter and music producer.
 Ron Kim (born 1979), member of the New York State Assembly who became the first Korean-American elected to New York's state legislature
 John F. Kennedy (1917-1963), President, attended Riverdale's Lower School
 Robert F. Kennedy (1925-1968), U.S. Senator
 Carlos Kleiber (1930-2004), conductor
 Gerard Koeppel, author, historian, and journalist
 Robert Krulwich, radio and television journalist
 John Lahr (born 1941), theater critic
 David Levin (born 1963), CEO of McGraw-Hill Education
 Leopold Mannes (1899-1964), co-creator of Kodachrome, the first color transparency film
 Lee MacPhail (1917-2012), Baseball Hall-of-Fame front-office executive
 Megan McArdle, an American blogger and journalist 
 Nick McDonell (born 1984), author
 Fred Melamed (born 1956), actor
 Howard Milstein, real estate developer 
 Steven Mnuchin (born 1962) United States Secretary of the Treasury 2017-2021
 Wes Moore (born 1978), author, social entrepreneur, producer and political analyst
 Tim Morehouse (born 1978), fencer who was a 2008 Olympic silver medalist
 William C. W. Mow (born 1936), entrepreneur, chairman and CEO of Bugle Boy Industries
 André Nemec (born 1972), screenwriter
 Robin Pogrebin (born 1965), journalist
 Ed Rendell (born 1944), Governor of Pennsylvania
 Cesar Romero (1907-1994), actor
 Clifford Ross (born 1952), photographer and artist
 Tracee Ellis Ross (born 1972), actress
 Andy Russell, founder and CEO of Trigger Media
 Carly Simon (born 1943), singer
 Scott Snyder, author
 Jordana Spiro (born 1977), actor, star of TBS series My Boys
 Max Stafford-Clark, an English theatre director 
 Ratan Tata (born 1937), chairman of Tata Group
 Jeffrey Vinik (born 1959), owner of the Tampa Bay Lightning.
 Joss Whedon (born 1964), writer, director, and executive producer; creator of several television series (Buffy the Vampire Slayer, Angel, Firefly, Serenity)
 David Yazbek (born 1961), composer, lyricist, writer of Broadway shows and TV including The Full Monty, The Band's Visit, Dirty Rotten Scoundrels, Women on the Verge of a Nervous Breakdown, etc.
 Tim Zagat (class of 1957), restaurant critic
 Michael Zakarin, guitarist for The Bravery

Notable staff
Nathan M. Pusey, president of Harvard University, (1953-1971) taught at Riverdale Country School  as did Victor L. Butterfield, president of Wesleyan University (1943-1967).

Associations
Riverdale is a member of the Ivy Preparatory School League and the New York State Association of Independent Schools.

Riverdale Country School, The Fieldston School, and Horace Mann School together are known as the "Hill Schools," as all three are located within two miles (3 km) of each other in the neighborhood of Riverdale on a hilly area above Van Cortlandt Park.

See also
 Education in New York City

References

External links
 

Private elementary schools in the Bronx
Private middle schools in the Bronx
Private high schools in the Bronx
Private K-12 schools in New York City
Preparatory schools in New York City
Educational institutions established in 1907
Riverdale, Bronx
1907 establishments in New York City
Ivy Preparatory School League